The 2003 Cambridge City Council election took place on 1 May 2003 to elect members of Cambridge City Council in England. This was on the same day as other nationwide local elections.

Results summary

Ward results

Abbey

Arbury

Castle

Cherry Hinton

Coleridge

East Chesterton

King's Hedges

Market

Newnham

Petersfield

Queen Edith's

Romsey

Trumpington

West Chesterton

References

Cambridge
2003
2000s in Cambridge